Paraeurina is a genus of frit flies in the family Chloropidae. There are at least two described species in Paraeurina.

Species
These two species belong to the genus Paraeurina:
 Paraeurina acuminata (Fedoseeva, 1964) c g
 Paraeurina chloropoides (Strobl, 1909) c g
Data sources: i = ITIS, c = Catalogue of Life, g = GBIF, b = Bugguide.net

References

Further reading

External links

 

Chloropinae
Chloropidae genera